William David Willson (April 27, 1865 – March 4, 1932) was a political figure in British Columbia. He represented Rossland from 1916 to 1920 in the Legislative Assembly of British Columbia as a Liberal.

He was the son of David William Willson and the former Sarah Ann Flett, having been born in 1865 in Milton, Ontario. Willson was mayor of Rossland from 1914 to 1916. He ran unsuccessfully for the Rossland City seat in the provincial assembly in a 1916 by-election held after Lorne Argyle Campbell was named to cabinet. Willson defeated Campbell in the general election held later that year. He died at Rossland in 1932.

References 

British Columbia Liberal Party MLAs
Mayors of places in British Columbia
1865 births
1932 deaths